This is a list of electricity-generating power stations in the U.S. state of Kentucky, sorted by type and name. In 2020, Kentucky had a total summer capacity of 17,599 MW through all of its power plants, and a net generation of 63,539 GWh. The corresponding electrical energy generation mix was 68.7% coal, 22.6% natural gas, 7.9% hydroelectric, and 0.5% biomass.  The remaining 0.3% was evenly split between solar and petroleum liquids.

Fossil-fuel power stations
Lists include data from U.S. Energy Information Administration

Coal

 Spurlock Station also supplements coal with up to 10% by-weight tire-derived fuel.

Natural gas

Petroleum

Renewable power stations 
Lists include data from U.S. Energy Information Administration

Biomass

Hydroelectric

Solar

Wind

Kentucky had no utility-scale wind farms in 2019.

See also

List of power stations in the United States
List of power stations operated by the Tennessee Valley Authority

Notes
E.W. Brown also uses Hydroelectric, Natural Gas, and Solar Energy.

References

Energy infrastructure in Kentucky
Kentucky
Power stations